The 2000–01 Sheffield Shield season known as the Pura Cup was the 99th season of the Sheffield Shield, the domestic first-class cricket competition of Australia. Queensland won the championship.

Table

Final

References

Sheffield Shield
Sheffield Shield
Sheffield Shield seasons